Wojciech Ozimek (born 24 July 1967) is a retired Polish football defender.

References

1967 births
Living people
Polish footballers
Błękitni Kielce players
Odra Wodzisław Śląski players
Górnik Zabrze players
Hutnik Nowa Huta players
Bahlinger SC players
Górnik Łęczna players
Pogoń Staszów players
FV Biberach players
Association football defenders
Polish expatriate footballers
Expatriate footballers in Germany
Polish expatriate sportspeople in Germany